The Crown Commercial Service (CCS) is  an executive agency and trading fund of the Cabinet Office of the UK Government. The CCS is responsible for managing the procurement of common goods and services, increasing savings for the taxpayer by centralising buying requirements, and leading on procurement policy on behalf of the government.

History
CCS was originally created as the Buying Agency on 1 April 1991. On 1 April 2000, it became part of the newly established Office of Government Commerce (OGC) within HM Treasury. On 1 April 2001, the Buying Agency, the Central Computer and Telecommunications Agency, Property Advisors to the Civil Estate and other units from the Treasury merged to form OGCbuying.solutions. The agency's name was changed to just Buying Solutions in April 2009. On 15 June 2010, it moved, along with its parent agency the OGC, to become part of the Efficiency and Reform Group within the Cabinet Office. Its name was changed to the Government Procurement Service (GPS) in July 2011. In January 2014 the GPS merged with the procurement management from government departments to form the Crown Commercial Service (CCS).

Operations
CCS operates as a trading fund established under the Government Trading Funds Act 1973, as amended in 1990, with offices in Liverpool, Norwich, Newport, Leeds and London.

Procurement services
CCS provides professional procurement services to the public sector to enable organisations to deliver improved value for money in their commercial activities and provide professional support when it matters, advising on technical issues, energy-saving and environmental improvements.

CCS's operations break down into framework agreements, which are a set of pre-tendered with a range of suppliers from which public sector customers can purchase goods and services. A small commission (typically less than 1%) is collected from the suppliers for each sale they make under these frameworks agreements.

Procurement policy
UK Government Procurement Policy Notes were in the past issued by CCS. These are now issued in the name of the Cabinet Office, but the CCS Helpdesk acts as the contact point for any queries. A separate series of Scottish Procurement Policy Notes is published by the Scottish Government.

Management of the Government Secure Intranet (GSi)
As part of its support of the national government Internet infrastructure, CCS manages the UK's Government Secure Intranet (GSi), including the entire third-level government domain .gsi.gov.uk and its sub-domains.

References

External links
 Official website
Cabinet Office, Efficiency and Reform Group, and Crown Commercial Service, Procurement policy notes, see also Procurement policy notes archived by the National Archives on 14 July 2014

Executive agencies of the United Kingdom government
Cabinet Office (United Kingdom)
Trading funds of the United Kingdom government
Government procurement in the United Kingdom
1991 establishments in the United Kingdom
Government agencies established in 1991
Organisations based in Liverpool